The Keys (stylized as the Keys) is the fourth extended play by South Korean girl group GWSN, released by Miles Entertainment on April 28, 2020. The EP features four tracks, with "BAZOOKA!" serving as the title track. Member Soso did not participate in this release due to health reasons.

Background
The Keys is GWSN's first release since moving to a new label (MILES), which is a subsidiary of their original entertainment company, Kiwi Media Group. Member Soso was absent from this release due to an ankle injury.

Commercial performance
The Keys debuted at number 6 on South Korea's Gaon Album Chart, becoming the group's first top ten entry. The EP sold 4,270 copies for the month of April 2020, thus within two days. It has sold 6,879 copies as of June 2020.

Track listing

Charts

References

2020 EPs
Korean-language EPs